Principal Riverwalk is a recreational park district along the banks of the Des Moines River in Des Moines, Iowa. After eight years of work, it was completed in January 2013.

Funded by the city of Des Moines, Principal Financial and the Iowa state government, Principal Riverwalk features a 1.2 mile recreational trail connecting the east and west sides of downtown via two pedestrian bridges.  Trails connect the Court Avenue District, CBD, East Village, Greater Des Moines Botanical Garden, Iowa Events Center and Gray's Lake with other metro area recreational trails. A landscaped promenade along the street level connects the riverfront amphitheater and several plazas, including an outdoor ice skating rink and summertime fountain plaza. A series of civic gardens with sculptures are located near Des Moines City Hall. Meredith Corporation contributed $2 million to fund the Meredith Trail, a pathway connecting Gray's Lake with the MLK Trail via the George Washington Carver Bridge.

References

External links
Principal Financial Group Riverwalk Web site

Redeveloped ports and waterfronts in the United States
Geography of Des Moines, Iowa
Tourist attractions in Des Moines, Iowa
Protected areas of Polk County, Iowa
Parks in Iowa
2013 establishments in Iowa